Wolfgang Junginger (27 October 1951 – 17 February 1982) was a German alpine skier who competed in the 1976 Winter Olympics. There he finished on 6th place in Special Slalom and on 4th place in Alpine Combined. Two years before, in World Championships at St. Moritz (Switzerland), he won the bronze medal in Alpine Combined. Mr. Junginger died in an airplane crash when he piloted a small airplane from Munich to Hannover in Germany. Including the pilot himself there were four persons in the plane and one of them was Mr. Ulrich Hoeness, well known manager of Bayern Munich. Mr. Hoeness was the only one who had survived the accident.

External links
 sports-reference.com

1951 births
1982 deaths
German male alpine skiers
Olympic alpine skiers of West Germany
Alpine skiers at the 1976 Winter Olympics
Aviators killed in aviation accidents or incidents in Germany
20th-century German people